Conard Logan Hunley (born April 9, 1945) is an American country music singer.

Life and career
Hunley was born in Knoxville, Tennessee, United States. After graduating from Central High School in Knoxville, Hunley began playing with local bands, maturing musically and gaining his first fans. Hunley joined the Air Force in 1965, and spent most of his service on a military base in Illinois, teaching aircraft mechanics. He played music in area clubs whenever possible.

After his tour of duty was finished Hunley returned to Knoxville and began performing weekly at a local nightclub (a dive called, "The Corner Lounge"), where he met businessman Sam Kirkpatrick, who formed the independent label Prairie Dust Records to showcase Hunley's talents. After some minor success on the country music chart, Hunley caught the attention of Warner Bros. Records, who signed him in 1978. Hunley recorded five albums with Warner Bros., released several singles on MCA Records and Capitol Records, and achieved more than 20 charted hits, including "Weekend Friend", "No Relief In Sight", and "Oh Girl". He toured throughout the U.S., playing large venues around the country with other musical acts, including Alabama, the Oak Ridge Boys, Larry Gatlin, George Jones and Tammy Wynette. In 1986 Hunley had his final chart appearance with "Quittin' Time".

Hunley recorded no new music for over a decade after his last release for Capitol Records. Hunley's long recording hiatus ended after signing with IMMI Records in 2004. He teamed again producer Norro Wilson, the architect of several of his early Warner Brothers hits, and added his first new recorded product in twenty years, Sweet Memories, to his catalog. The album was selected by CMT.com as one of the top 10 albums of 2004.

In early 2006, IMMI Records released Shoot from the Heart, another collaboration by Hunley and Norro Wilson. Hunley co-wrote two of the songs with songwriters Kim Williams and Larry Shell.

Hunley participates in celebrity golf tournaments around the country, and hosts one of his own each year in his hometown of Knoxville, Tennessee, which has raised over a million dollars for charities benefiting underprivileged children.

Discography

Albums

Singles

References

External links

CMT:News "Top 10 Country Albums of 2004 Contemporary Superstars, Newcomers and Seasoned Veterans Make the List" December 28, 2004 Edward Morris Retrieved On 2009-04-09
Knoxville News Sentinel "Con Hunley Led By His Heart" March 7, 2004 Wayne Bledsoe Retrieved On 2009-04-09
Angrycountry.com "Con Hunley: New Album After An Absence From Country Music" August 26, 2004 Christine Bohorfoush Retrieved On 2009-04-09

1945 births
Living people
American country pianists
American male pianists
American male singer-songwriters
American country singer-songwriters
People from Knoxville, Tennessee
Singer-songwriters from Tennessee
Warner Records artists
20th-century American pianists
Country musicians from Tennessee
21st-century American pianists
20th-century American male musicians
21st-century American male musicians